Pixianxi railway station or Pixian West railway station is a railway station of Chengdu–Dujiangyan Intercity Railway. The station located in Pidu District, Chengdu, Sichuan, China. It is served by the Chengdu Tram.

Destinations and Prices

Rolling Stock
China Railways CRH1A

See also
Chengdu–Dujiangyan Intercity Railway

Stations on the Chengdu–Dujiangyan Intercity Railway
Railway stations in Sichuan
Railway stations in China opened in 2010